X-Men: God Loves, Man Kills (Marvel Graphic Novel #5) is an original graphic novel published in 1982 by Marvel Comics, starring their popular superhero team the X-Men. It was written by Chris Claremont and illustrated by Brent Anderson. The book served as a primary inspiration for the 20th Century Fox film X2, which saw Claremont return to write the novelization.

Publication history 
According to artist Neal Adams, he was originally approached by Marvel editor-in-chief Jim Shooter to illustrate an early version of X-Men: God Loves, Man Kills (whose plot, according to Adams, was conceived of by Shooter). Since Adams insisted that his contract not be a standard-work-for-hire agreement, Marvel eventually chose Brent Anderson as the illustrator—despite the fact that Adams had already penciled some preliminary pages.

God Loves, Man Kills was initially conceived as a non-canon X-Men story. The original first draft script called for the death of Magneto (which was illustrated by Neal Adams before his departure from the project), which would be the trigger event for the X-Men to begin investigating Stryker. Magneto's death was dropped once Adams left the project and the script rewritten into what became the published version.

Published in 1982, for years the canonical status of God Loves, Man Kills existed in a state of flux. It was not officially considered canon until 2003, when the second X-Men film (which borrowed heavily from the graphic novel) was released in theaters and a sequel series, God Loves Man Kills II was published in X-Treme X-Men #25–30.

For later volumes of the Essential X-Men trade paperback series, the issue is placed between The Uncanny X-Men #167 and #168. This is due to Cyclops' involvement in the story (Cyclops left the team after #167) and for the presence of the time displaced aging of Illyana Rasputin.

Plot summary
Magneto is investigating the murder of two mutant children who were killed by henchmen of the Reverend William Stryker. Stryker, who murdered his wife and newborn son after his son (a deformed mutant child) was born, seeks the wholesale extermination of mutantkind while presenting himself to the public as a fire and brimstone preacher, spreading a message claiming that mutants are abominations in the eyes of God. After a television debate with Professor Charles Xavier, Stryker (who knows that Xavier is a mutant) kidnaps him, forcing the X-Men to team up with Magneto to find their mentor.

Xavier has been hooked up to a machine that will use his telepathic power to kill all of the world's mutants via cerebral hemorrhage. At a revival meeting, where a popular US Senator (who is a closeted mutant) is in attendance, Magneto and the X-Men confront Stryker and rescue Xavier. In the end, after Shadowcat and Nightcrawler successfully bait Stryker into admitting kidnapping Xavier and his plans for mutant genocide, Stryker is shot in the chest by a security guard when he tries to murder Shadowcat in public.

Magneto and the X-Men part ways, with Magneto politely turning down an offer by Xavier to join the X-Men. However, before he leaves, he reminds the X-Men that Stryker may have the final victory, as already his defenders rally to him as he awaits trial for his crimes.

In other media

In film
The plot of the 2003 film X2 took inspiration from God Loves, Man Kills. Some of the similarities include:
William Stryker is the main villain.
The collaboration of the X-Men with Magneto, their arch-rival
The kidnapping of Professor Charles Xavier and some of his X-Men
The use of Professor X and a duplicate Cerebro to mentally kill all the mutants on Earth

There are also differences in the storyline, however. Some of the main differences are:
William Stryker in the movie is a military scientist rather than a minister. The comic's Stryker was involved in the military at one point in his life, but left that to become a preacher long before the events of the novel.
Both versions of Stryker have a mutant child, though in the novel, the child had already died prior to the events of the novel. In fact, Stryker himself killed his just-born son who happened to be a mutant (Though this was later retconned in 2013 in the All-New X-Men series). In the movie, his child is still alive.
In the film, Stryker is responsible for Wolverine receiving his adamantium bones and claws; in the comic, they had never met prior to the events of the novel. 
In the novel, Stryker and his men are able to kidnap Professor X, Cyclops, and Storm. In the movie, only the first two are kidnapped.
In the movie, Jean Grey is not only prominent, but the film foreshadows Dark Phoenix. In the comics, The Dark Phoenix Saga has already occurred, thus, Jean Grey did not appear in this storyline in the comics.
Instead of trying to escape with the X-Men after freeing Professor X as happened in the comics, in the film Magneto tries to use Dark Cerebro and the hypnotized Professor X for his goal of eliminating humans in which Stryker was horrified that it was used against him, only to be stopped by Storm and Nightcrawler.

References

External links
WorldCat – Find in a Library – X-Men : God Loves, Man Kills

1982 graphic novels
1982 comics debuts
Books by Chris Claremont
Comics by Chris Claremont
God Loves, Man Kills
Superhero graphic novels
Marvel Comics graphic novels
Marvel Comics adapted into films